Odolo is a town and comune in the province of Brescia, in Lombardy, Italy.

Twin towns
Odolo is twinned with:

  Gonnosfanadiga, Italy, since 2008

References

External links

Cities and towns in Lombardy